Rubus grimesii is a North American species of flowering plant in the rose family. It is native to the east-central United States (Delaware, Maryland, Virginia, North Carolina).

The genetics of Rubus is extremely complex, so that it is difficult to decide on which groups should be recognized as species. There are many rare species with limited ranges such as this. Further study is suggested to clarify the taxonomy.

References

grimesii
Plants described in 1932
Flora of the Eastern United States